The field hockey competition at the 1991 European Youth Olympic Days was held from 18 to 20 July. The events took place in Brussels, Belgium. Girls  born 1976 or 1977 or later participated in the event. No boys event was held.

Medal summary

References

1991 European Youth Olympic Days
European Youth Olympic Days
1991 European Youth Olympic Days